Reshetnikov is a Russian masculine surname, its feminine counterpart is Reshetnikova. It may refer to:

Fyodor Reshetnikov – several people
Igor Reshetnikov (born 1975), Russian football player
Leonid Reshetnikov (born 1986), Russian football player
Leonid Petrovich Reshetnikov (born 1947), Lieutenant-General of Russian Foreign Intelligence Service
Tatyana Reshetnikova (born 1966), Russian Olympic hurdler
Vasily Reshetnikov (born 1919), Soviet World War II pilot 
Veniamin Reshetnikov (born 1986), Russian sabre fencer

Russian-language surnames